Ioane Hawaii is a Tuvalun para table tennis player and disability rights activist who has represented Tuvalu at the Pacific Games.

Hawaii studied at the University of the South Pacific on an Australia Awards scholarship, graduating in 2021 with a diploma in economics. He began playing table tennis in 2014.

In 2017 he competed in the Oceania Para Table Tennis Championships.

At the 2019 Pacific Games in Apia he won gold in the men's seated singles table tennis, becoming the first Tuvaluan to win gold at the games.

References

Living people
University of the South Pacific alumni
Tuvaluan table tennis players
Year of birth missing (living people)